An X-ray telescope (XRT) is a telescope that is designed to observe remote objects in the X-ray spectrum.  In order to get above the Earth's atmosphere, which is opaque to X-rays, X-ray telescopes must be mounted on high altitude rockets, balloons or artificial satellites.

The basic elements of the telescope are the optics (focusing or collimating), that collects the radiation entering the telescope, and the detector, on which the radiation is collected and measured. A variety of different designs and technologies have been used for these elements.

Many of the existing telescopes on satellites are compounded of multiple copies or variations of a detector-telescope system, whose capabilities add or complement each other and additional fixed or removable elements (filters, spectrometers) that add functionalities to the instrument.

Optics

The most common methods used in X-ray optics are grazing incidence mirrors and collimated apertures.

Focusing mirrors

The utilization of X-ray mirrors allows to focus the incident radiation on the detector plane. Different geometries (e.g. Kirkpartick-Baez or Lobster-eye) have been suggested or employed, but almost the totality of existing telescopes employs some variation of the Wolter I design. The limitations of this type of X-ray optics result in much narrower fields of view (typically <1 degree) than visible or UV telescopes.

With respect to collimated optics, focusing optics allow:
 a high resolution imaging
 a high telescope sensitivity: since radiation is focused on a small area, Signal-to-noise ratio is much higher for this kind of instruments.

The mirrors can be made of ceramic or metal foil coated with a thin layer of a reflective material (typically gold or iridium). Mirrors based on this construction work on the basis of total reflection of light at grazing incidence.

This technology is limited in energy range by the inverse relation between critical angle for total reflection and radiation energy. The limit in the early 2000s with Chandra and XMM-Newton X-ray observatories was about 15 kilo-electronvolt (keV) light. Using new multi-layered coated mirrors, the X-ray mirror for the NuSTAR telescope pushed this up to 79 keV light. To reflect at this level, glass layers were multi-coated with tungsten (W)/silicon (Si) or platinum (Pt)/silicon carbide(SiC).

Collimating optics

While earlier X-ray telescopes were using simple collimating techniques (e.g. rotating collimators, wire collimators), the technology most currently used on present days employs coded aperture masks. This technique uses a flat aperture patterned grille in front of the detector. This design results less sensitive than focusing optics and imaging quality and identification of source position is much poorer, however it offers a larger field of view and can be employed at higher energies, where grazing incidence optics become ineffective. Also the imaging is not direct, but the image is rather reconstructed by post-processing of the signal.

Detectors
Several technologies have been employed on detectors for X-ray telescopes, ranging from counters like Ionization chambers, geiger counters or scintillators to imaging detectors like CCDs or CMOS sensors. The use of micro-calorimeters, that offer the added capability of measuring with great accuracy the energy of the radiation, is planned for future missions.

Missions employing X-ray telescopes

History of X-ray telescopes

The first X-ray telescope employing Wolter Type I grazing-incidence optics was employed in a rocket-borne experiment on October 15, 1963, 1605 UT at White Sands New Mexico using a Ball Brothers Corporation pointing control on an Aerobee 150 rocket to obtain the X-ray images of the Sun in the 8–20 angstrom region. The second flight was in 1965 at the same launch site (R. Giacconi et al., ApJ 142, 1274 (1965)).

The Einstein Observatory (1978–1981), also known as HEAO-2, was the first orbiting X-ray observatory with a Wolter Type I telescope (R. Giacconi et al., ApJ 230,540 (1979)). It obtained high-resolution X-ray images in the energy range from 0.1 to 4 keV of stars of all types, supernova remnants, galaxies, and clusters of galaxies. HEAO-1 (1977–1979) and
HEAO-3 (1979–1981) were others in that series. Another large project was ROSAT (active from 1990 to 1999), which was a heavy X-ray space observatory with focusing X-ray optics.

The Chandra X-Ray Observatory is among the recent satellite observatories launched by NASA, and by the Space Agencies of Europe, Japan, and Russia. Chandra has operated for more than 10 years in a high elliptical orbit, returning thousands 0.5 arc-second images and high-resolution spectra of all kinds of astronomical objects in the energy range from 0.5 to 8.0 keV. Many of the spectacular images from Chandra can be seen on the NASA/Goddard website.

NuStar is one of the latest X-ray space telescopes, launched in June 2012. The telescope observes radiation in a high-energy range (3–79 keV), and with high resolution.  NuStar is sensitive to the 68 and 78 keV signals from decay of 44Ti in supernovae.

Gravity and Extreme Magnetism (GEMS) would have measured X-ray polarization but was canceled in 2012.

See also
 List of telescope types
 List of X-ray space telescopes
 X-ray astronomy
 Wolter telescope: A type of X-ray telescope built with glancing incidence mirrors.

References

External links

Scientific applications of soft x-ray microscopy

 
Radiography
Solar telescopes
Scientific techniques